Roy (born 18 March 1992) is an Indian singer, music director and actor.

Primary life

Roy was interested in music since his childhood. He completed his primary education from Haridwar, and afterwards, his family shifted to Delhi, where he did his higher education and pursued Geography (Hons.) from University of Delhi.

Roy teamed up with Lyricist- Director Sheel and released his debut single "Bunty Bubbly" on 1 February 2017 with T-Series. It is a fusion of Hindi and Haryanvi.

Later in the same year, i.e. September 2017, Roy released his second single "Roothe yaar". This song was directed by Director Sheel and was released by T-Series.

Latest release "Raanjhnaa" was a sad song which was written and Directed by Sheel and  Music was done by Roy. The song was released by T-Series on 18 April 2018.

Discography

 Bunty Bubbly  (Released on 1 Feb 2017 by T-Series).
 Roothe Yaar  (Released on 7th Sept 2017 by T-Series)
 Raanjhnaa  (Released on 18 April  2018 by T-Series) )
 Bachchhan Paandey Instrumental for Bachchhan Paandey (2022) (Bollywood Debut)
 Kaali Teri Gutt for Phone Bhoot (2022) (Bollywood film)
 Mister Mummy (2022) (Bollywood film; background score)

References

External links 

http://newznew.com/ranjhanaa-a-punjabi-romantic-track-by-roy/

Indian rappers
Indian record producers
Living people
People from Delhi
Punjabi people
People from Punjab, India
1992 births
Punjabi-language singers